Senator Bucco may refer to:

Anthony R. Bucco (1938–2019), New Jersey  State Senate
Anthony M. Bucco (born 1962), New Jersey  State Senate